Barrau de Sescas (fl. 1295–1304) was a Gascon knight in English service.  In 1295 he became the first person to be appointed to the position of admiral by an English King, after Edward I appointed him Admiral of the Fleet of Bayonne.  Barrau served in that role during the Anglo-French War of 1294–1303 escorting merchant convoys and breaking a French blockade to provide supplies to the besieged fortresses of Bourg and Blaye.  Later in the war he served with Edward's royal household during the king's 1297–1298 expedition to Flanders.  In 1299 he became joint lieutenant of Gascony, a titular position as it was then under French occupation.  After the 1303 Treaty of Paris restored Gascony to the English Barrau was appointed castellan of Bayonne and bailiff of Labourd, serving until 1304.

Biography 
Barrau de Sescas was Gascon by birth and based in Bayonne, Gascony.  He held an estate in Gascony, which was then controlled by the English crown, and was a vassal of the lords of Albret.

On 1 March 1295 Barrau became the first person to be appointed to the title of admiral by an English king when Edward I made him Admiral of the Fleet of Bayonne, during the Anglo-French War of 1294–1303; it was not until later that year the other commanders of English naval forces were described as admirals and the first appointed as such was Gervase Alard when he was appointed  Captain and Admiral of the Fleet of the Cinque Ports.  In the early part of the war the Anglo-Gascon forces held maritime supremacy, though Barrau's ships did have to break through a French naval blockade to resupply the fortresses of Bourg and Blaye which were under French siege.  Barrau's supplies allowed the fortresses to hold out until a truce was agreed in 1297.  His ships also safeguarded English merchant convoys in Gascon waters. Historian N. A. M. Rodger states that Barrau's actions at sea were vital in saving Gascony as an English province as the income from Bayonne's sea trade was key in providing for its defence.  Historian Malcolm Vale regards the appointment of Barrau as one of Edward and John II, Duke of Brittany's wisest moves.

Barrau petitioned Edward at Plympton, Devon, in 1297 to complain that he had spent 100 marks more in his role as admiral than he received in wages. Later in 1297 Barrau joined Edward's royal household during his expedition against the French in Flanders.
  There is no evidence that Barrau was retained in the household upon its return to England in 1298.  The following year Barrau was one of six Gascon knights awarded a pension by the king.  Barrau's pension was financed by land confiscated from foreigners in England and provided 50 pounds chipotenses, a Gascon currency, per annum: a total of around £10.  Also in 1299 Barrau was selected as joint lieutenant of Gascony, with Pey-Arnaut de Vic.  He served from 1 November 1299 to 24 July 1302.  Barrau was considered an unusually low-ranking courtier for the position, which was usually held by a lord.  He was perhaps chosen by the king because Gascony was considered of low importance as it was then under French control.  Following the 1303 Treaty of Paris, which restored Gascony to the English crown, Barrau served as castellan of Bayonne and bailiff of Labourd from 5 August 1303 to 11 April 1304.  His clerk, Fortz de Pegeres, was out of service by 1305 when he petitioned the king for employment or a pension as his and his brothers' homes in Roquetaillade and Castelnau-de-Sarneis had been destroyed by the French in war.

A road in Bayonne is named after Barrau, the "Rue Barreau de Sescars".

References 

13th-century births
14th-century deaths
English admirals
French knights